William de Botreaux (1367–1395) (pronounced "But'ry") was a baron prominent in  South-West Britain.

Origins
He was the son of William de Botreaux, 1st Baron Botreaux (died 1391) and inherited his father's lands aged 24.

Career
He received a writ of summons to attend parliament on 7 September 1391.

Marriage
He married Elizabeth St. Lo daughter and co-heiress of Sir John St. Lo (Latinised to St. Laudo) of Newton St Loe, Wiltshire (now in Somerset), by his second wife Margaret Clyvedon, daughter and heiress of John Clyvedon. Elizabeth was  sole heiress of her mother and survived her husband, her date of death having occurred on 4 September between 1409 and 1458.

Death
He died on 25 May 1395.

Progeny
He left the following progeny:
William de Botreaux, 3rd Baron Botreaux (1388–1462)

Sources
Cokayne, The Complete Peerage, new edition, vol 2, pp. 241–242

References

1367 births
1395 deaths
Barons Botreaux